Bruno Frick (born 31 May 1953) is Swiss politician of the Christian Democratic People's Party (CVP/PDC). Frick has been a member of the Swiss Council of States for the Canton of Schwyz since 1991. In 2005, he was president of the Council of States.

External links
https://web.archive.org/web/20071020173729/http://www.brunofrick.ch/ 

Law office Roesle Frick & Partners
Notary Public of Einsiedeln/Switzerland

1953 births
Living people
Members of the Council of States (Switzerland)
Presidents of the Council of States (Switzerland)
Christian Democratic People's Party of Switzerland politicians